Anna Maria Mühe (born 23 July 1985) is a German actress.

Biography

Born in Berlin to actor Ulrich Mühe (1953–2007) and actress Jenny Gröllmann (1947–2006), she was invited by director Maria von Heland to a casting for Big Girls Don't Cry. She also played in a video of Schiller's song "Sehnsucht".

Awards
 Golden Camera for Best Newcomer
 Shooting Stars Award 2012, annual acting award for up-and-coming actors by European Film Promotion.

Selected filmography 

Big Girls Don't Cry (2002)
Love in Thoughts (2004)
Tatort: Verraten und verkauft (2003, TV series episode)
Delphinsommer (2004)
Escape (2004)
Die letzte Schlacht (2005)
Running on Empty (2006)
 (2006)
 (2008)
The Bill: Proof of Life (2008, TV series episode)
Leipzig Homicide: Entführung in London (2008, TV series episode)
The Countess (2009)
 (2009, TV film)
 (2011)
Cracks in the Shell (2011)
 (2012)
 (2012, TV film)
Not My Day (2014)
NSU German History X (2016)
 (2016, TV film)
My Blind Date With Life (2017)
Dogs of Berlin (2018, TV series)
 Totenfrau (2022, tv series)

References

External links 

 Anna Maria Mühe at fitz+skoglund agency
 Anna Maria Mühe at her newest filmproject Novemberkind

1985 births
Living people
Actresses from Berlin
German film actresses
German television actresses
People from East Berlin
21st-century German actresses
20th-century German women